Hoechst, Hochst, or Höchst may refer to:

 Hoechst AG, a former German life-sciences company
 Hoechst stain, one of a family of fluorescent DNA-binding compounds
 Höchst (Frankfurt am Main), a city district of Frankfurt am Main, Germany
 Frankfurt Höchst station, its railway station
 SG 01 Hoechst, German association football club
 Höchst im Odenwald, a community in Hesse, Germany
 Höchst, Austria, a municipality in Vorarlberg, Austria
 Nicole Höchst (born 1970), German politician for the Alternative for Germany
Hochst. taxonomic author abbreviation of Christian Ferdinand Friedrich Hochstetter (1787–1860), German botanist
 Battle of Höchst (1622), fought between Catholic and Protestant armies
 Battle of Höchst (1795), fought between the Habsburg Austrian and French Republican armies